Agnes Eva Hughes,  ( Snodgrass;  1856 – 10 June 1940) was a political activist in Victoria, Australia. She was one of the founders and presidents of the Australian Women's National League, and campaigned for conscription in the First World War.

Hughes was married to the businessman and army officer Frederic Hughes.

In popular culture
Eva Hughes is one of the six Australians whose war experiences are presented in The War That Changed Us, a four-part television documentary series about Australia's involvement in the First World War.

References

External links
 

1856 births
1940 deaths
Activists from Melbourne
Australian feminists
Australian Officers of the Order of the British Empire